Branislav Rapáč (born 4 June 1993) is a Slovak professional ice hockey player who currently playing for HK Spišská Nová Ves of the Slovak Extraliga.

Career statistics

Regular season and playoffs

International

References

External links

 

1993 births
Living people
Sportspeople from Spišská Nová Ves
Slovak ice hockey left wingers
HC Košice players
HK Poprad players
HK Nitra players
MHC Martin players
ŠHK 37 Piešťany players
MHk 32 Liptovský Mikuláš players
HC Dynamo Pardubice players
Des Moines Buccaneers players
HC Slovan Bratislava players
HK Spišská Nová Ves players
Slovak expatriate ice hockey players in the Czech Republic
Slovak expatriate ice hockey players in the United States